The Stolpersteine in Zlín Region lists the Stolpersteine in the Zlín Region in the central-eastern part of Moravia. Stolpersteine is the German name for stumbling blocks collocated all over Europe by German artist Gunter Demnig. They remember the fate of the Nazi victims being murdered, deported, exiled or driven to suicide.

Generally, the stumbling blocks are posed in front of the building where the victims had their last self chosen residence. The name of the Stolpersteine in Czech is stolpersteine, or alternatively, kameny zmizelých, stones of the disappeared.

The lists are sortable; the basic order follows the alphabet according to the last name of the victim.

Boršice

Kroměříž

Dates of collocations 
The Stolpersteine in the Zlínský kraj were collocated by the artist himself on the following dates:
 18 July 2013: Boršice
 16 September 2014: Kroměříž
  6 November 2017: Kroměříž, the family of rabbi Joachim Astel
  16 April 2019: Kroměříž, the family of Felix Presser

See also 
 List of cities by country that have stolpersteine
 Stolpersteine in the Czech Republic

External links

 stolpersteine.eu, Demnig's website
 holocaust.cz Czech databank of Holocaust victims
 Yad Vashem, Central Database of Shoah Victims' Names

References

Zlínský kraj